Unity may refer to:

Buildings
 Unity Building, Oregon, Illinois, US; a historic building
 Unity Building (Chicago), Illinois, US; a skyscraper
 Unity Buildings, Liverpool, UK; two buildings in England
 Unity Chapel, Wyoming, Wisconsin, US; a historic building
 Unity Church (Mattoon, Illinois), US; a historic church
 Unity Temple, Oak Park, Illinois, US; a Unitarian Universalist church

Education
 Unity Academy (disambiguation)
 Unity College (disambiguation)
 Unity School District (Wisconsin), an American school district
 Unity University, an Ethiopian privately owned institute of higher learning

Media and entertainment
 Classical unities, three rules for drama described by Aristotle
 Assassin's Creed Unity, a 2014 action-adventure video game
 "Unity" (comics), a crossover story line in the Valiant universe
 Unity (film), a 2015 documentary
 Unity 1918, a 2001 play by Kevin Kerr
 "Unity" (Star Trek: Voyager), a 1997 episode of the American science fiction television series
 Unity (team), a superhero team in titles published by Valiant Entertainment
 Unity (video game), a cancelled video game for the Nintendo GameCube
 Unity 101, a radio station in Southampton, England
 UNITY Journalists, an American alliance of journalists' associations
 Unity Performing Arts Foundation, a fine arts company based in Fort Wayne, Indiana
 "Unity", a 2006 episode of I Pity the Fool

Music
 Unity Christian Music Festival, a Michigan music festival

Albums
 Walt Dickerson Plays Unity, 1964
 Unity (Larry Young album), 1966
 Unity (Sun Ra album), 1977
 Unity (311 album), 1991
 Unity (Big Mountain album), 1994
 Unity (EP), a 1999 split EP by Dropkick Murphys and Agnostic Front
 Unity (Avishai Cohen album), 2001
 Unity (Rage album), 2002
 Unity (George album), 2003
 Unity (Frank Wright album), 2006

Bands
 The Unity, a Nepalese band featuring DA69 (Sudin Pokharel), Asif Shah, and Aidray
 Unity, a band formed by members of Uniform Choice
 UNITY, a Dutch girl group which represented the Netherlands in the Junior Eurovision Song Contest 2020

Songs
 "Unity" (Afrika Bambaataa and James Brown song), 1985
 "Unity" (Shinedown song), 2012
 "Unity" (TheFatRat song), 2014
 "U.N.I.T.Y.", a 1993 song by Queen Latifah
 "Unity", a song by Desmond Dekker and the Aces from the album Action!
 "Unity", a song by Kelly Rowland from the album Ms. Kelly
 "Unity", a song by Mordechai Ben David and Shea Mendelowitz, 1998
 "Unity", a song by Operation Ivy, 1989, also covered by many punk rock acts

Places
 Unity, Saskatchewan, Canada
 Unity State, South Sudan
 Unity Village, Guyana

United States
 Unity, Georgia, an unincorporated community
 Unity, Illinois or Hodges Park Station, an unincorporated community
 Unity, Kentucky, a small unincorporated community
 Unity, Maine, a town in Waldo County
 Unity (CDP), Maine, a census-designated place within the town
 Unity, Kennebec County, Maine, unorganized territory
 Unity, Missouri
 Unity, New Hampshire
 Unity, Adams County, Ohio
 Unity, Columbiana County, Ohio
 Unity, Oregon, a small city in Baker County
 Unity, Lane County, Oregon, an unincorporated community
 Unity, South Carolina, a census-designated place
 Unity, Wisconsin, a village in Clark and Marathon counties
 Unity, Clark County, Wisconsin, a town
 Unity, Trempealeau County, Wisconsin, a town
 Unity Township, Westmoreland County, Pennsylvania
 Unity Village, Missouri

People
 Unity Bainbridge (1916–2017), Canadian artist and poet
 Unity Dow (born 1959), judge, activist, writer and Government minister from Botswana
 Unity Phelan, American ballet dancer
 Unity Mitford (1914–1948),  British socialite and fascist
 Unity Spencer (1930–2017), British artist

Politics
 Unity (asylum seekers organisation), a 2005 UK human rights group
 Unity (trade union), a British pottery workers' union
 Unity (Canada), a 1930s Communist movement
 Unity (Georgia), a left-wing political party
 Unity (Hungary), a 2014 political alliance
 Unity (Latvian political party), a liberal-conservative party
 Unity (Russian political party), a 1999 party
 Unity (Transnistria), a 2000 political party
 Unity Party (disambiguation)
 Unity Committee, an 1878 organization for Bulgarians in Thrace and Macedonia
 Yedinstvo (Lithuania), a pro-Moscow movement during the Perestroika era

Religion
 Unity Church, also known as the Unity School of Christianity
 Great Unity, a Confucian concept of an utopian world

Science and technology
 Unity (mathematics), the number 1
 A concept in ring theory in mathematics, also called identity
 Unity (ISS module), a segment of the International Space Station
 Unity (cable system), for trans-Pacific communications
 VSS Unity, a rocket-powered suborbital spaceplane

Ships
 Unitie, a ship of the Third Supply fleet to Virginia colony in 1609
 Unité, a French ship captured by the Royal Navy and renamed 
 HMS Unity, the name of several ships of the Royal Navy
 Unity (schooner), a ship that disappeared near Tasmania in 1813

Software
 Unity (user interface), from Canonical (Ubuntu 11.04–17.04)
 Unity Application Block, part of Microsoft Enterprise Library
 Unity (game engine), a multi-platform game engine and development toolkit
 Unity Technologies, developer of Unity game engine
 UNITY (programming language), a 1988 theoretical language
 Unity Operating System a Chinese linux distro

Other uses
 Unity (military operation), the covert supply of Thai troops to the Laotian Civil War
 Unity (newspaper), a weekly publication by the Communist Party of Ireland in Belfast, UK
 Unity (peer education project), a peer education project in the Dutch nightlife
 Unity in diversity, a philosophical concept
 Unity of invention, a patent law requirement
 Unity of opposites
 Unity Bridge (disambiguation), various bridges
 Unity Day (disambiguation), various holidays
 Unity FC (Canada), a Canadian soccer team
 Unity FC (Ghana), a Ghanan football team

See also

 Uniti, an Italian river
 Unanimity
 Unified (disambiguation)
 Unify (disambiguation)
 Unit (disambiguation)
 Unite (disambiguation)
 United (disambiguation)